A police van (also known as a paddy wagon, meat wagon, divisional van, patrol van, patrol wagon, police wagon, Black Mariah/Maria, police carrier, or in old-fashioned usage, pie wagon) is a type of vehicle operated by police forces. Police vans are usually employed for the transport of prisoners inside a specially adapted cell in the vehicle, or for the rapid transport of a number of officers to an incident.

History

Early police vans were in the form of horse-drawn carriages, with the carriage being in the form of a secure holding cell. Frank Fowler Loomis designed the first police patrol wagon. These panel trucks became known as "pie wagons", due to their fancied resemblance to delivery vans used by bakeries. That usage had faded by the 1970s. In the modern age, motorised police vans replaced the older Black Maria and paddy wagon types as they were usually crudely adapted for accommodation of prisoners.

The need for a secure police van was realised when prisoners who were resisting arrest needed to be transported. The concern was that if transported in a conventional patrol car, the prisoner might attack the officers during the journey.

To combat this, police vans were designed with a fixed steel cage in the rear of the vehicle effectively separating the prisoner from the officers.

Etymology

Paddy wagon

The precise origin of the term is uncertain and disputed, though its use dates back to the 1800s.

There are two theories as to how the term originated.
One theory holds that "paddy wagon" was simply a shortening of "patrol wagon", in the same way police cars are called patrol cars today.
In the United States, "Paddy" was a common Irish shortening of Padraig (Patrick in English) which is an ethnic slur to refer to Irish people. Over half the people arrested in New York in the 1840s and 1850s were Irish, so that police vans were dubbed "paddy wagons" and episodes of mob violence in the streets were called "donnybrooks", named after a town in Ireland.

Black Maria

These vehicles were usually painted black or a very dark blue. In the United Kingdom, Ireland, Australia, New Zealand and the United States, a police wagon was also sometimes called a Black Maria. The origin of this term is equally uncertain. The name Black Maria is common for race horses beginning with an 1832 appearance in Niles Weekly Register (October 10) and then again in Colburn's New Monthly Magazine and Humorist (1841). The OED lists the first usage in 1835. An example from Philadelphia was published in 1852. Brewer's Dictionary of Phrase and Fable suggests the name came from Maria Lee, a large and fearsome black keeper of a sailors' boarding house whom the police would call on for help with difficult prisoners. The English translation of the French detective novel , published in 1868 by Émile Gaboriau, uses the term Black Maria when referring to a police van. The term is featured heavily in Solzhenitsyn's The Gulag Archipelago. In his 1949 song "Saturday Night Fish Fry", Louis Jordan mentions a Black Maria. In a 1962 article in the Hackensack, New Jersey newspaper The Record, it claims that the name Black Maria is named after a "large and riotous London woman...She was often picked up by the police for excessive drinking on Saturday nights. When the van went by, people would say 'There goes Black Maria again!' and the word stuck."

The term is still used today in parts of Britain for the vehicle that transports prisoners from gaol to court. Frequently, blackened-windowed buses are also used for the same purpose. Popular British band, The Clash, makes reference to the Black Maria in the song "The Guns of Brixton" on their seminal 1979 album London Calling:"You know it means no mercy

They caught him with a gun

No need for the Black Maria

Goodbye to the Brixton sun"The song refers to the London police tendency of using citizen possession of a firearm to justify use of lethal force, therefore "No need for the Black Maria", ie. no need to arrange for transporting anyone to jail because the police won't be making any attempt to bring them in alive.

Use of vans

Individual police stations may have a van for the accommodation of prisoners and transportation of officers. The Metropolitan Police Service in England makes extensive use of these, particularly among the Territorial Support Group, which carries out public order duties and adapts the vans to carry riot protection equipment.

Police vans may have a flip down wire shield across the windscreen, which helps prevent projectiles from damaging the vehicle.

Many forces now differentiate between a "Carrier"—a vehicle used for Public Order situations and therefore equipped with shields etc.—and what is commonly known as a "Cub Van", a small van with a cage in the back.

Some police departments, such as the Baltimore Police Department and Philadelphia Police Department, have been accused of braking abruptly or steering sharply in order to inflict injuries on unbuckled prisoners, a technique called a "rough ride". Most notably, Freddie Gray allegedly died as a result of such a ride in 2015. Other prisoners have received large settlements after becoming paralyzed during transportation in police vans.

See also
Police car
Prisoner transport vehicle
Police bus

References

External links

Van
Irish-American history
Vans